Mike Seal (born July 30, 1977)  professional mixed martial artist, actor, and stuntman competing in the Middleweight division. A professional competitor since 2000, he has fought for Strikeforce, Bellator MMA, Sengoku Raiden Championship and King of the Cage.

Mixed martial arts career

Early career
Seal started his career in 2002. In his first four years, he fought mainly for Mexican and American southwestern promotions, such as King of the Cage, Gladiator Challenge and MMA Mexico.

In 2006, Seal signed with Strikeforce.

Strikeforce
Seal faced UFC veteran Eugene Jackson on June 9, 2006 at Strikeforce: Revenge. He lost via TKO in the second round.

World Victory Road
Seal faced 2006 Pride FC welterweight grand prix winner Kazuo Misaki on December 30, 2010 at Sengoku: Soul of Fight. He lost via TKO early in the first round.

In 2012, Seal signed with Bellator.

Bellator Fighting Championships
Seal faced Jonas Billstein on May 25, 2012 at Bellator 70. He lost via technical submission in the first round.

Mixed martial arts record

|-
| Loss
| align=center| 13–16–1 (1)
| Cedric Marks
| Decision (unanimous)
| Moore EFC 1
| 
| align=center| 3
| align=center| 5:00
| Payson, Arizona, United States
| 
|-
| Loss
| align=center| 13–15–1 (1)
| Jonas Billstein
| Technical submission (rear-naked choke)
| Bellator 70
| 
| align=center| 1
| align=center| 2:55
| New Orleans, Louisiana, United States
| 
|-
| Loss
| align=center| 13–14–1 (1)
| Kazuo Misaki
| TKO (punches)
| World Victory Road Presents: Soul of Fight
| 
| align=center| 1
| align=center| 1:15
| Tokyo, Japan
| 
|-
| Loss
| align=center| 13–13–1 (1)
| Timothy Woods
| Technical submission (rear-naked choke)
| UWC 8: Judgment Day
| 
| align=center| 2
| align=center| 3:35
| Fairfax, Virginia, United States
| 
|-
| Win
| align=center| 13–12–1 (1)
| Marcos Rodriguez
| TKO (injury)
| COF 7: Face Off
| 
| align=center| 1
| align=center| N/A
| Tijuana, Baja California, Mexico
| 
|-
| Win
| align=center| 12–12–1 (1)
| John Cronk
| TKO (submission to punches)
| Sky UTE Fighting
| 
| align=center| 2
| align=center| 4:25
| Ignacio, Colorado, United States
| 
|-
| Win
| align=center| 11–12–1 (1)
| David Watts
| KO (punches)
| TC 17: Proving Ground
| 
| align=center| 1
| align=center| 0:55
| Yuma, Arizona, United States
| 
|-
| Loss
| align=center| 10–12–1 (1)
| Eugene Jackson
| TKO (punches)
| Strikeforce: Revenge
| 
| align=center| 2
| align=center| 2:49
| San Jose, California, United States
| 
|-
| Win
| align=center| 10–11–1 (1)
| Stacy Hakes
| TKO (corner stoppage)
| Cage of Fire 1
| 
| align=center| 1
| align=center| 3:27
| Tijuana, Baja California, Mexico
| 
|-
| Loss
| align=center| 9–11–1 (1)
| Edson Carvalho
| N/A
| MMA Fighting Challenge 4
| 
| align=center| N/A
| align=center| N/A
| Guadalajara, Jalisco, Mexico
| 
|-
| Loss
| align=center| 9–10–1 (1)
| Stefanos Miltsakakis
| Submission (kimura)
| Universal Above Ground Fighting
| 
| align=center| 1
| align=center| N/A
| Los Angeles, California, United States
| 
|-
| Loss
| align=center| 9–9–1 (1)
| Aaron Licciardello
| Decision (unanimous)
| WEF: Sin City
| 
| align=center| 3
| align=center| 5:00
| Las Vegas, Nevada, United States
| 
|-
| Win
| align=center| 9–8–1 (1)
| Stacy Hakes
| Submission (verbal)
| Xtreme Cage Fighter 8
| 
| align=center| 1
| align=center| 2:10
| Redding, California, United States
| 
|-
| Win
| align=center| 8–8–1 (1)
| Josh Tamsen
| TKO (punches)
| Crown Fighting Championship 2
| 
| align=center| 1
| align=center| N/A
| Rosarito Beach, Baja California, Mexico
| 
|-
| Loss
| align=center| 7–8–1 (1)
| Art Santore
| Submission (choke)
| UAGF: Clover Combat
| 
| align=center| 1
| align=center| 3:19
| Santa Barbara, California, United States
| 
|-
| NC
| align=center| 7–7–1 (1)
| Chilo Cordova
| No Contest
| PNRF: Inferno
| 
| align=center| N/A
| align=center| N/A
| Santa Fe, New Mexico, United States
| 
|-
| Loss
| align=center| 7–7–1
| Ricco Rodriguez
| Submission (rear-naked choke)
| MMA Mexico: Day 2
| 
| align=center| 1
| align=center| 1:06
| Ciudad Juárez, Chihuahua, Mexico
| 
|-
| Loss
| align=center| 7–6–1
| Jon Fitch
| TKO (injury)
| MMA Mexico: Day 1
| 
| align=center| 2
| align=center| 2:35
| Ciudad Juárez, Chihuahua, Mexico
| 
|-
| Loss
| align=center| 7–5–1
| Dennis Hallman
| Submission (rear-naked choke)
| SF 6: Battleground in Reno
| 
| align=center| 1
| align=center| 0:50
| Reno, Nevada, United States
| 
|-
| Win
| align=center| 7–4–1
| Paulo Gazze
| TKO (punches)
| Venom: First Strike
| 
| align=center| 1
| align=center| 3:27
| Huntington Beach, California, United States
| 
|-
| Win
| align=center| 6–4–1
| Armando Aguirre
| KO
| CFC 1
| 
| align=center| 1
| align=center| 0:36
| Rosarito Beach, Baja California, Mexico
| 
|-
| Loss
| align=center| 5–4–1
| Tony Bonello
| Submission (rear-naked choke)
| XFC 5: When Worlds Collide
| 
| align=center| 1
| align=center| N/A
| Southport, Queensland, Australia
| 
|-
| Win
| align=center| 5–3–1
| Cedric Marks
| TKO (submission to punches)
| RM 5: Road to the Championship
| 
| align=center| 1
| align=center| N/A
| Tijuana, Baja California, Mexico
| 
|-
| Draw
| align=center| 4–3–1
| Reggie Orr
| Draw
| KOTC 37: Unfinished Business
| 
| align=center| 2
| align=center| 5:00
| San Jacinto, California, United States
| 
|-
| Win
| align=center| 4–3
| Ron Cushen
| KO (punches)
| Gladiator Challenge 25
| 
| align=center| 1
| align=center| 0:39
| Porterville, California, United States
| 
|-
| Win
| align=center| 3–3
| Cedric Marks
| TKO (submission to punches)
| Total Combat 2
| 
| align=center| 2
| align=center| 0:45
| Tijuana, Baja California, Mexico
| 
|-
| Loss
| align=center| 2–3
| Chad Davis
| Submission (triangle choke)
| KOTC 33: After Shock
| 
| align=center| 2
| align=center| 1:47
| San Jacinto, California, United States
| 
|-
| Win
| align=center| 2–2
| Michael Martin
| TKO (punch)
| KOTC 31: King of the Cage 31
| 
| align=center| 1
| align=center| 0:23
| San Jacinto, California, United States
| 
|-
| Loss
| align=center| 1–2
| Cedric Marks
| Submission (rear-naked choke)
| RM 4: Beat Down in Baja
| 
| align=center| 2
| align=center| 1:53
| Tijuana, Baja California, Mexico
| 
|-
| Win
| align=center| 1–1
| Adam Rendon
| TKO (punches)
| Reto Maximo 3
| 
| align=center| 1
| align=center| 4:10
| Tijuana, Baja California, Mexico
| 
|-
| Loss
| align=center| 0–1
| Chris Albandia
| Submission (rear-naked choke)
| Combate Libre Mexico 3
| 
| align=center| N/A
| align=center| N/A
| Mexico
|

Filmography

Film

Television

References 

1977 births
Living people
Mexican male mixed martial artists
Middleweight mixed martial artists
People from Slidell, Louisiana
Sportspeople from Tijuana